The first participation of Peru in Miss Universe pageant created great expectations for the following year among the Peruvians, the newspaper La Crónica takes the rights over the MU franchise and the private clubs and associations from different districts, cities and regions of Peru start to choose candidates for Miss Peru Pageant 1953.

After casting in many different Peruvian cities the 37 ladies started to compete, 15 survived the first cut and past to the semi-finals. Following that they were narrowed down to six finalist, the runners-up and winner were called from this group, then proceeded to crowning and award show.

The Miss Perú 1953 pageant was held on June 26, 1953. The chosen winner represented Peru at the Miss Universe 1953.

Placements

Special Awards

 Miss Elegance - Ucayali - Mary Ann Sarmiento
 Miss Congeniality - Cuzco - Eloisa Guzmán
 Miss Photogenic - Trujillo - Lidia Mantilla Mayer

.

Delegates

Amazonas - Vanessa Verelli 
Apurímac - Maria Jose Reyes
Cajamarca - Jessica Carranza
Chaclacayo - Martha Elena Quiroga
Cuzco - Eloisa Guzmán 
Distrito Capital - María Luisa de la Borda
Ica - Gwendoline Ramos
Iquitos - Regina Sandoval

La Punta - Zoila Lyons
Loreto  - Marisela Ocampo
Pisco - Leonor Monfor Jarufe
Tacna -  Alissa Reséndez
Tingo María - Jessica Del Valle
Trujillo - Lidia Mantilla Mayer
Ucayali - Mary Ann Sarmiento

.

Trivia

 Despite the fact that Ucayali is an official region of Peru since 1980, The Rotary Club of Pucallpa sponsors Mary Ann's participation in Miss Peru Pageant. For this reason she is considerate the first Miss Ucayali (and the most successful one at the National Pageant and at Miss Universe Pageant to the present day).

.

References 

Miss Peru
1953 in Peru
1953 beauty pageants